Aldyn-ool Takashovich Sevek (died 2011) was a master Tuvan throat singer.

Sevek was from Mogur Aksi, a remote village in the Tuvan mountains. He was an accomplished master of khöömei, especially The Dag (mountain) Kargyraa style, for which he is a household name in the world of throat singing. His unique style is instantly recognizable on recordings, and despite many attempts, no-one has been able to successfully reproduce his sound. For a time, he performed with the group Yat-Kha. Sevek won the Grand Prize at the International Symposium of Throat-Singing.

Sevek died of throat cancer on the 11th September 2011.

References 

20th-century Russian male singers
20th-century Russian singers
Throat singing
Year of birth missing
2011 deaths
Tuvan musicians